Metal Gear is a stealth action video game series created by Hideo Kojima and developed and published by Konami. The series debuted in Japan on July 12, 1987 with Metal Gear and is one of Konami's best-selling franchises, with over 26.5 million units sold. The games take place in a semi-fictional universe with stories that involve a special forces agent (Solid Snake in most games) who is forced to destroy the latest incarnation of the superweapon Metal Gear, as well as having to rescue various hostages and neutralize certain renegade units in the process. Metal Gear titles have been released on numerous video game consoles, handheld game consoles, and personal computer platforms. Related novels, comics, and other dramatizations have also been released. A few of the series' main characters have also appeared in other Konami games.

The first game was followed by a heavily modified port for the Nintendo Entertainment System (NES), developed without Kojima's involvement. This game earned enough popularity to garner a sequel, again without Kojima's involvement, released outside Japan. The development of this game inspired Kojima to make an official sequel, Metal Gear 2: Solid Snake. As the series moved into three-dimensional graphics, Kojima decided to title the next game in the series Metal Gear Solid instead of Metal Gear 3; the "Solid" title has been used for all 3D action Metal Gear games since. Several non-action games have also been released, including the Metal Gear Acid games, which have a card-based system of gameplay.

Video games

Mainline

MSX2

Solid series

Remakes and expanded editions

Box sets and bundles

Spin-offs

NES

Ghost Babel

Acid series

Online series

Portable Ops series

Rising

Survive

Mobile games

Pachislot

Other media

Interactive

DVD

Printed

Audio dramas

Music albums

References 

Metal Gear
Metal Gear
Metal Gear